Jack Parkinson may refer to:

 Jack Parkinson (basketball) (1924–1997), American professional basketball player
 Jack Parkinson (footballer, born 1883), English forward for Liverpool 
 Jack Parkinson (footballer, born 1869), English forward for Blackpool

See also
John Parkinson (disambiguation)